Vinjar Slåtten (born 16 July 1990) is a Norwegian freestyle skier.

He competed in the 2018 Winter Olympics in Pyeongchang, finishing 6th in the 
Mens Freestyle moguls event. 

He competed at the FIS Freestyle Ski and Snowboarding World Championships 2017, where he placed 7th in  men's moguls. He also have a podium finish in the Deer Valley World Cup.

References

External links
 
 
 

1990 births
Living people
Norwegian male freestyle skiers
Freestyle skiers at the 2018 Winter Olympics
Olympic freestyle skiers of Norway
People from Voss
Sportspeople from Vestland